Messaoud Nedjahi (24 January 1954 – 30 August 2021) was an Algerian writer and singer-songwriter.

Biography
Nedjahi was born in M'Chouneche on 24 January 1954 and moved to Batna in 1958 following expulsion from the French government. His father was deported to Cayenne and died in 1970. Nedjahi underwent persecution for speaking the Shawiya language, with his play, Jugurta, being banned in 1974. Afterwards, he translated poems in Shawiya.

One of his art exhibitions was vandalized and his friend, Safia de Tamlilt, was burned. In 1979, he met Dihya and became her writer, composer, and arranger.

In 1980, Nedjahi participated in the Berber Spring in Algiers, Tizi Ouzou, and Boumerdès and refused to enlist for his Algerian military service. After the threat of imprisonment, he went into exile in France in 1981, where he stayed for 27 years.

Nedjahi devoted himself to writing and publishing, reissuing works by Apuleius, such as The Golden Ass. He also led conferences which covered themes of Berber civilization, personal identity, Apuleius, and the Berber experience. In 2008, he returned to Algeria and settled in the Aurès region. In 2016, he was invited to give a lecture on the history of Batna at the Centre universitaire Saleh Daoud.

Nedjahi died of COVID-19 in Paris on 30 August 2021, at the age of 67.

Books
La becquée n'a pas suffi
Aurès insolite
Aurès insoumis
Aurès ou les feuillets morts d'un amnésique
Massinissa, le seigneur des coquelicots
Jugurtha, l'héritier du coquelicot
Autopsie d'une identité
Profession : Infirmière
Tamenraset sous la neige
Ug Zelmad l'insoumis
Les anges naissent en Aurès
Les trois précieuses
La muse m'a dit
Systole et diastole

Musical albums
A yudan!
Iwal
Tulawin n tmurt inu
Mas Aksel

References

1954 births
2021 deaths
Algerian emigrants to France
Deaths from the COVID-19 pandemic in France
Algerian male writers
Algerian songwriters
Algerian exiles
People from Biskra Province